Ardanuç District is a district of Artvin Province of Turkey. Its seat is the town Ardanuç. Its area is 958 km2, and its population is 11,198 (2021).

Composition
There is one municipality in Ardanuç District:
 Ardanuç

There are 49 villages in Ardanuç District:

 Akarsu
 Anaçlı
 Aşağıırmaklar
 Aşıklar
 Avcılar
 Aydınköy
 Bağlıca
 Ballı
 Beratlı
 Bereket
 Boyalı
 Bulanık
 Çakıllar
 Cevizlik
 Çıralar
 Ekşinar
 Ferhatlı
 Geçitli
 Gökçe
 Güleş
 Gümüşhane
 Hamurlu
 Harmanlı
 Hisarlı
 İncilli
 Kapıköy
 Karlı
 Kaşıkçı
 Kızılcık
 Konaklı
 Kutlu
 Meşeköy
 Müezzinler
 Naldöken
 Örtülü
 Ovacık
 Peynirli
 Sakarya
 Soğanlı
 Tepedüzü
 Torbalı
 Tosunlu
 Tütünlü
 Ustalar
 Yaylacık
 Yolağzı
 Yolüstü
 Yukarıırmaklar
 Zekeriyaköy

References

Districts of Artvin Province